Hoseynabad-e Yek (also Romanized as Ḩoseynābād-e Yek; also known as Ḩoseynābād) is a village in Gevar Rural District, Sarduiyeh District, Jiroft County, Kerman Province, Iran. At the 2006 census, its population was 44, in 10 families.

References 

Populated places in Jiroft County